Events from the year 1855 in China.

Incumbents 
 Xianfeng Emperor (5th year)

Viceroys
 Viceroy of Zhili —  Guiliang

Events 

 Nian Rebellion
 Zhang Lexing took direct action by launching attacks against government troops in central China
 By the summer, the fast-moving Nian cavalry, well-trained and fully equipped with modern firearms, had cut the lines of communication between Beijing and the Qing armies fighting the Taiping rebels in the south.
 Taiping Rebellion
 March — Northern Expedition (Taiping Rebellion) defeated, Taiping advance in Northern China halted
 The 3,000 kilns at Jingdezhen, Jiangxi are destroyed by the Taipings
 Miao Rebellion (1854–73)
 Western naval campaigns against Chinese pirates
 Battle of the Leotung
 Battle of Ty-ho Bay
 Third plague pandemic, major bubonic plague pandemic that begins in Yunnan and later spread across China and into India
 Punti-Hakka Clan Wars begin
 Red Turban Rebellion (1854–1856)

Births 
 Gurun Princess Rong'an (7 May 1855 – 28 February 1875) was a princess of the Qing Dynasty
 Xu Shichang (October 20, 1855 – June 5, 1939) was the President of the Republic of China, in Beijing, from 10 October 1918 to 2 June 1922. The only permanent president of the Beiyang government to be a civilian, his presidency was also the longest of the warlord era.
 Metrophanes, Chi Sung (December 10, 1855 – June 10, 1900) was the first Chinese Eastern Orthodox priest to be martyred. He was killed with his family members and church followers in 1900 during the Boxer Rebellion
 Ni Tian (Chinese: 倪田; 1855–1919), born as Baotian, courtesy name Mogeng, sobriquet as Modaoren and Biyuehezhu, was a Chinese painter in Qing Dynasty and Republic Period.
 Ma Anliang (1855 – November 24, 1918) was a Hui born in Hezhou, Gansu, China. He became a general in the Qing dynasty army, and of the Republic of China.
 Bi Xiugu (Chinese: 畢秀姑, 1855-1930) also known as Xiao Baicai and Bi Jinlian was the main figure of a cause célèbre in 1870s China known as Yang Niawu and Xiao Baicai

Deaths 
 Liang Fa (1789–1855), also known by other names, was the second Chinese Protestant convert and the first Chinese Protestant minister and evangelist
 Empress Xiaojingcheng (19 June 1812 – 21 August 1855) was an Imperial Noble Consort of the Daoguang Emperor of the Qing dynasty.
 Li Kaifang, killed in the Taiping Rebellion's Northern Expedition
 Bao Shichen, killed in the Taiping Rebellion's Northern Expedition

References